Rebecca Tope is a British crime novelist and journalist. She is the author of three murder mystery series, featuring the fictional characters of Den Cooper, a Devon police detective; Drew Slocombe, a former nurse, now an undertaker; Thea Osborne, a house sitter in the Cotswolds; and Persimmon Brown, a florist in the Lake District. Tope is also ghost writer of the novels based on the ITV series Rosemary and Thyme.

Background
Rebecca Tope was born on 2 October 1948, in Worcestershire, and has lived in many parts of England since then. She has nearly 40 crime novels in print, published by Allison & Busby. Her two main series are set in the Cotswolds and the Lake District, both featuring amateur female detectives.

She lives on a smallholding in Herefordshire, but has had no livestock for some years. The acres have been returned to the wildlife, which includes a lot of brambles and thistles.

She founded a small press, Praxis Books, in 1992, which has concentrated almost exclusively on reissuing the works of Sabine Baring-Gould (1834–1924). She has also written and published a definitive biography of Baring-Gould.

Tope's hobbies mainly centre around wool, antique auctions and travel.

Bibliography

The Cotswold Mysteries
A Cotswold Killing 23 May 2005, Allison & Busby 
A Cotswold Ordeal 31 October 2006, Allison & Busby 
Death in the Cotswolds 28 April 2008, Allison & Busby 
A Cotswold Mystery 28 August 2008, Allison & Busby 
Blood in the Cotswolds 7 September 2009, Allison & Busby 
Slaughter in the Cotswolds 22 February 2010, Allison & Busby 
Fear in the Cotswolds 13 September 2010, Allison & Busby 
Grave in the Cotswolds 4 April 2011, Allison & Busby 
Deception in the Cotswolds (re-issued) 26 March 2012, Allison & Busby 
Malice in the Cotswolds 26 March 2012, Allison & Busby 
Shadows in the Cotswolds 25 March 2013, Allison & Busby 
Trouble in the Cotswolds 24 March 2014, Allison & Busby 
Revenge in the Cotswolds 19 March 2015, Allison & Busby 
Guilt in the Cotswolds 24 March 2016, Allison & Busby 
A Cotswold Casebook (short stories) 20 April 2017, Allison & Busby 
Peril in the Cotswolds 24 August 2017, Allison & Busby 
Crisis in the Cotswolds 19 April 2019, Allison & Busby 
Secrets in the Cotswolds 24 August 2019, Allison & Busby 
A Cotswold Christmas Mystery (forthcoming)

West Country Mysteries
A Dirty Death Reprint edition 28 May 2012, Allison & Busby 
Dark Undertakings 28 May 2012, Allison & Busby 
Death of a Friend Reprint edition 28 May 2012, Allison & Busby 
Grave Concerns 7 February 2011, Allison & Busby 
A Death to Record 28 May 2012, Allison & Busby 
The Sting of Death Reprint edition 7 February 2011, Allison & Busby 
A Market for Murder Reprint edition 7 February 2011, Allison & Busby

Lake District Mysteries
The Windermere Witness 26 November 2012, Allison & Busby 
The Ambleside Alibi 26 August 2013, Allison & Busby  
The Coniston Case 24 July 2014, Allison & Busby  
The Troutbeck Testimony 21 May 2015, Allison & Busby  
The Hawkshead Hostage 19 May 2016, Allison & Busby  
The Bowness Bequest 18 May 2017, Allison & Busby  
The Staveley Suspect 19 April 2018, Allison & Busby  
The Grasmere Grudge 21 March 2019, Allison & Busby  
The Patterdale Plot 20 February 2020, Allison & Busby 
’’The Threlkeld Theory’’ 2022, Allison & Busby {{ISBN 978-0749028619

Ghostwritten
Three novelisations of Rosemary and Thyme, credited to ITV series creator Brian Eastman, which were published in Britain by Allison and Busby and in Australia by Hardie Grant Books:
 And No Birds Sing (published in 2004, based on the pilot episode) Allison & Busby 
 The Tree of Death (published in 2005, based on the final episode of Series 1) Allison & Busby 
 Memory of Water (published in 2006, based on the feature-length opening episode of Series 2) Allison & Busby

Awards
2009 Longlisted for Crimefest (International Crime Fiction Convention) "Sounds of Crime (unabridged)" for Blood in the Cotswolds (read by Caroline Lennon)
2010 Longlisted for Crimefest "eDunnit Award" for Fear in the Cotswolds
2010 Longlisted for Crimefest "Sounds of Crime longlist – unabridged" for Slaughter in the Cotswolds (read by Caroline Lennon)
2011 Longlisted for Crimefest "eDunnit Award" for A Grave in the Cotswolds
2011 Longlisted for Crimefest "Sounds of Crime longlist – unabridged" for A Grave in the Cotswolds (read by Caroline Lennon)
2012 Longlisted for Crimefest "Audible Sounds of Crime" for Deception in the Cotswolds (read by Caroline Lennon)
2012 Longlisted for Crimefest "Goldsboro Last Laugh Award" for Deception in the Cotswolds
2012 Longlisted for Crimefest "eDunnit Award" for Deception in the Cotswolds

References

External links

Living people
English women journalists
British crime journalists
21st-century English novelists
1964 births
English women novelists
21st-century English women writers
Women crime writers